Bathurst Lighthouse is one of two lighthouses on Rottnest Island, the other being Wadjemup Lighthouse. It is located on Bathurst Point, in the northeast of the island, and was activated in 1900. The lighthouse was erected in response to a series of shipping disasters in the area, which included the loss of City of York in 1899.

The light source and lantern house were originally to be used at Cape Leeuwin but were then built in on Rottnest Island. In 1920 the original acetylene flame was replaced by a flasher, which made the keeper superfluous. An electric light was installed in 1986.

Bathurst Lighthouse serves as the rear light in the pair of Kingston Reef's leading lights, which guide ships departing from Fremantle through the reefs near the island. Its light is characterised by a group of four flashes that occurs every sixteen seconds.

See also

 List of lighthouses in Australia

References

Further reading

Lighthouses completed in 1900
Lighthouses in Western Australia
State Register of Heritage Places on Rottnest Island